The Danbury Hatters were a minor league baseball team that was located in Danbury, Connecticut and played from 1887 to 1914.

References

External links
Baseball Reference

Professional baseball teams in Connecticut
Defunct Atlantic League teams
Defunct Connecticut State League teams
Defunct Eastern League (1938–present) teams
Defunct New York-New Jersey League teams
Danbury, Connecticut
1887 establishments in Connecticut
1914 disestablishments in Connecticut
Baseball teams established in 1887
Baseball teams disestablished in 1914
Defunct baseball teams in Connecticut
Sports in Fairfield County, Connecticut